Sir John Hall  (21 September 1911 — 19 January 1978) was a British Conservative Party politician.

Education and business career
Hall was educated privately and worked as a chartered secretary and company director, including of Viskase and Bass Charrington.

Political career
Hall first stood for Parliament without success in Grimsby in 1950 and Fulham East in 1951. He was elected as Member of Parliament (MP) for Wycombe at a by-election in November 1952. Hall served as an opposition spokesman on Treasury, economic affairs and trade until October 1965. He was an executive member of the 1922 Committee from 1964 to 1966 and vice-chairman of the Conservative parliamentary finance committee from 1965.

He was knighted in July 1973 "for political and public services".

Hall suffered a heart attack in the summer of 1977 and soon announced he would not stand for election again. He died at a hospital in London on 19 January 1978, aged 66. His death triggered the by-election.

Personal life
In 1935, Hall married Nancy Doreen Hampton Blake. They had a son and a daughter. The Halls lived at Carlisle Place, London SW1.

References

External links 

1911 births
1978 deaths
Conservative Party (UK) MPs for English constituencies
Knights Bachelor
Officers of the Order of the British Empire
Politicians awarded knighthoods
Royal Artillery officers
UK MPs 1951–1955
UK MPs 1955–1959
UK MPs 1959–1964
UK MPs 1964–1966
UK MPs 1966–1970
UK MPs 1970–1974
UK MPs 1974
UK MPs 1974–1979